Francis Clarke (25 March 185718 May 1939) was an Australian politician.

Early life
Clarke was born in Stroud, New South Wales, the son of Thomas Clarke and Ellen Walsh. He attended St Stanislaus' College at Bathurst before becoming a surveyor.

Political career
He was a member of the New South Wales Legislative Assembly from 1893 to 1898, winning the seat of Macleay as the Protectionist Party candidate at the 1893 by-election, but it was abolished the following year and replaced by Hastings and Macleay which he won, holding it in 1895 and 1898. Clarke played a role in expediting the re-inclusion of Edmund Barton in the Australasian Federal Convention for the establishment of the Australian Federation. Barton was a major driver in the Federation movement but as he lost his seat in the NSW Colonial parliament he faced exclusion from the discussions. To expedite his return to the political process Clarke resigned from his safe seat of Hastings and the Macleay triggering a by-election which Barton won with Clarke's endorsement.

Serving as an early alderman of the Borough of North Sydney, Clarke served a single term as mayor (1898–1899). He was later appointed a member of the New South Wales Legislative Council from 1899–1900, representing the Protectionist Party.

In 1901, he was elected to the Australian House of Representatives as the Protectionist member for Cowper. He held the seat until his defeat in 1903 by Henry Lee of the Free Trade Party.

Later life
After leaving politics he was drafted as a member of the Royal Commission on Customs and Tariffs 1904-07 and the Royal Commission on Northern Territory railways and ports (1913–1914). On 21 December 1933 he was granted permission to retain the title "The Honourable" because he had been a member of the first federal parliament.

References

 

Protectionist Party members of the Parliament of Australia
Members of the Australian House of Representatives for Cowper
Members of the Australian House of Representatives
Members of the New South Wales Legislative Assembly
Members of the New South Wales Legislative Council
1857 births
1939 deaths
20th-century Australian politicians
Australian surveyors
Mayors of North Sydney